Albert Abiodun Adeogun was a member of 6th and 8th House of Representatives (Nigeria) and deputy governor aspirant to the gubernatorial ambition of Ademola Adeleke in Osun state. He was elected as member of Nigeria's 6th House of Representatives in 2007 and also reelected in 2015 to represent Ife Federal Constituency, comprising Ife Central, Ife North, Ife South and Ife East.

References 

Members of the House of Representatives (Nigeria)
Yoruba politicians
Living people
Year of birth missing (living people)
Yoruba academics
People from Osun State
People from Ife